Sojas (also Romanized as Sojās, Sujās and Sudzhas) is a city in, and the capital of, Sojas Rud District of Khodabandeh County, Zanjan province, Iran. At the 2006 census, its population was 5,577 in 1,345 households. The following census in 2011 counted 6,666 people in 1,725 households. The latest census in 2016 showed a population of 7,037 people in 2,038 households.

References 

Khodabandeh County

Cities in Zanjan Province

Populated places in Zanjan Province

Populated places in Khodabandeh County